Armando Araiza (born Armando Araiza Herrera on September 1, 1969) is a Mexican actor.

Early life
Araiza was born September 1, 1969, in Mexico City, Mexico. He is a son of director Raúl Araiza and actress Norma Herrera. He has an older brother, also actor Raúl Araiza. 

He first appeared in the telenovela for thirteen years in the telenovela El maleficio as Juanito, with his parents. In 1987 participate in the historical telenovela about Mexican revolution, Senda de gloria, when he played Gilberto in the same year he made two movies Ases del narcotráfico and Lamberto Quintero taking small roles and then participate in the telenovela Quinceañera as Chato.

In 1988, he played in a film Itara, el guardián de la muerte, a year later he returned to the telenovela Dulce desafío with Adela Noriega and Eduardo Yañez.

In 1990, he played in the telenovela Un rostro en mi pasado and in a films Más corazón que odio, Escoria otra parte de Tí, Viernes trágico and Odio en la sangre.

In 1991, he appeared in nine Mexican films Dentro de la noche, Orgía de sangre, La silla de ruedas, Hacer el amor con otro, Pandillas salvajes, Pandillas salvajes 2, Dos locos en aprietos, Yo soy la ley and Resucitaré para matarlos. In 1992, he appeared in two more films Superviviencia and Relaciones violentas.

In 1993, he was in Los Temerarios, Sueño y realidad, Contrabando de esmeraldas, Círculo de vicio, Johnny cien pesos and En espera de la muerte. In 1994 appears in the Silla de ruedas 3, Juana la cubana, Amor que mata y Duelo final, the same year he participated in the historical drama El vuelo del águila and films Tres minutos de oscuridad y Doble indemnización.

Filmography

Awards and nominations

References

External links

1969 births
Living people
Mexican male child actors
Mexican male telenovela actors
Mexican male television actors
Mexican male film actors
Male actors from Mexico City
20th-century Mexican male actors
21st-century Mexican male actors